Samir Dilou is a Tunisian politician. He served as the Minister of human rights, transitional justice and government spokesperson under Prime Minister Hamadi Jebali.

Biography

Early life
Samir Dilou was born in Tunis in 1966. He graduated from the University of Sousse in 1991. He was sentenced to ten years in prison as a result of his political involvement with the students' union Union Générale des Etudiants de Tunisie (UGET).

Career
He is a lawyer and a member of the Executive Committee of the Ennahda Movement. He is one of the founders of the International Organization to Defend Political Prisoners and a member of Truth and Work Organization in Switzerland. On 20 December 2011, he joined the Jebali Cabinet as Minister of Human Rights and Transitional Justice and Spokesperson of the Government.

Minister

Some opposition sources claim that in February 2012, he criticised freedom of the press. His opponents claim that he later added that freedom of expression and strikes were a privilege, not a right. He also decided to remove the police from the campus of Manouba University in Manouba, where students have been demonstrating to wear the niquab.

His opponents maintain also that in the same month, he said on Samir El-Wafi's program on national television that homosexuality was not a human rights issue, but a condition in need of medical treatment. Amnesty International condemned this statement. In June 2012, he rejected the United Nations Human Rights Council's recommendation to decriminalize same-sex intercourse, arguing it was a Western concept at odds with Islam, Tunisian culture and traditions. Critics have argued the anti-gay legislation was passed under French Tunisia.

See also
18 October Coalition for Rights and Freedoms

References

1966 births
Living people
People from Tunis
Tunisian Muslims
20th-century Tunisian lawyers
Government ministers of Tunisia
Ennahda politicians
University of Sousse alumni
Members of the Constituent Assembly of Tunisia
Members of the Assembly of the Representatives of the People
21st-century Tunisian lawyers